Bhabani Bhattacharya (10 November 1906–10 October 1988) was an Indian writer, of Bengali origin, who wrote social-realist fiction. He was born in Bhagalpur, part of the Bengal Presidency in British India. Bhattacharya gained a bachelor's degree from Patna University and a doctorate from the University of London. He returned to India and joined the diplomatic service. Bhattacharya served in the United States, to which country he returned as a teacher of literary studies once he had left the service. He taught in Hawaii, and later in Seattle. In his mid-thirties Bhattacharya began writing fiction set in historically and socially realistic contexts. He wrote in English, his chosen medium following the advice of two prominent literary figures.

Personal life
Bhattacharya was born in Bhagalpur, part of the Bengal Presidency of British India. His parents were Bengalis. Bhattacharya studied at Patna University and received a bachelor's degree in English literature. He subsequently completed his graduate studies in the United Kingdom. While his original choice was to do so in literature, a hostile attitude from one of the professors prompted him to switch to history. Bhattacharya received Master's (1931) and Doctoral degrees (1934) from the University of London.

As a graduate student, Bhattacharya became involved with Marxist circles, and was also strongly influenced by Harold Laski, one of his teachers. He was also active in literary circles and had work published in various magazines and newspapers. Some of Bhattacharya's articles were published in The Spectator, and he developed a friendship with the editor, Francis Yeats-Brown.  During this time, Bhattacharya also interacted with  Rabindranath Tagore. He translated Tagore's poem The Golden Boat into English in 1930. Both Yeats-Brown and Tagore advised Bhattacharya to write his fiction in English, rather than Bengali.

On completion of his doctoral studies Bhattacharya moved to Calcutta and soon got married. After a few years, he joined the diplomatic service, serving in the Indian Embassy in Washington, D. C. as a Press Attaché, returning to India after completing that service. Bhattacharya accepted an offer to join the University of Hawaii as a visiting faculty, subsequently moving permanently to Seattle to take up a chair at the University of Washington.

Literary review

Writing style and reception
Bhattacharya is described as belonging to the social realism school of Indo-Anglian literature. His writings exhibit the influence of Rabindranath Tagore and Mahatma Gandhi. Unlike other social realists like Premchand, Bhattacharya adopted a pedagogical approach to making novels out of ideas, utilizing satire and making his ideas more tangible through situational examples.

The range of South Indian writers who seems to dominate the scene of 'Gandhian Fiction' Bhabani Bhtatacharya deserves to be mention for his first novel 'So Many Hungers'(1947), published few months after Independence. set in a context of the 1942-43 Bengal famine and Quit India Movement this complicated and didactic novel takes its characters through a rigorously Gandhian education. It is at one level, the story of Kajoli, a village girl who righteously rejects the prostitution forced on her by the destitution of her family, to sell newspapers and so also to assume the persona of the Gandhian 'New Woman.' At another level, it deals with the spiritual and political growing up of Rahoul, a Cambridge educated astrophysicist who simultaneously discovers the limits of intellectualism and Western civilization and renounces both in favour of nationalism and village based economy. Much of his instruction comes by way of his grand father, Devata, a saintly Gandhian figure with a penchant for the hunger strike, who is responsible for bringing satyagraha to the village of Baruni, where he lives like one of the peasant.

Awards
 Sahitya Akademi Award, 1967

Notable works

 Some Memorable Yesterdays (Pustak Bhandar, 1941)
 So Many Hungers! (Hind Kitabs Limited, 1947)
 Indian Cavalcade (Nalanda Publications, 1948)
 He Who Rides a Tiger (Jaico Publishing House, 1955)
 The Golden Boat (Jaico Publishing House, 1956)
 Towards Universal Man (Visva Bharti Shantiniketan, 1961)
 Music for Mohini (Jaico Publishing House, 1964)
 Shadow from Ladakh (Hind Pocket Books Ltd., 1966)
 A Goddess Named Gold (Hind Pocket Books Ltd., 1967)
 Steel Hawk and Other Stories (Hind Pocket Books Ltd., 1968) 
 Gandhi the Writer (National Book Trust, 1969)
 A Dream in Hawaii (The MacMillan Company of India Limited, 1978)
 Socio-Political  Currents  in  Bengal:  A  Nineteenth  Century  Perspective (Vikas, 1980)

References

Bibliography

1906 births
1988 deaths
Indian male novelists
Indian male short story writers
Indian expatriates in England
English-language writers from India
Novelists from Bihar
Writers from Kolkata
Recipients of the Sahitya Akademi Award in English
Tamil writers
Alumni of King's College London
Alumni of the University of London
20th-century Indian novelists
20th-century Indian short story writers
People from Bhagalpur
20th-century Indian male writers